The women's 78 kg competition in at the 2021 African Judo Championships was held on 22 May at the Dakar Arena in Dakar, Senegal.

Results

Main Round

Repechage

References

External links
 

W78
Africa
African W78